Illinois Route 38 is an  west–east state highway that runs across northern Illinois. It runs from U.S. Route 52 (US 52) in downtown Dixon to US 12/US 20/US 45 (Mannheim Road) in Westchester.  It runs concurrently with the Lincoln Highway between Dixon and the junction of Illinois Route 31 in Geneva where it transitions via State Street onto Roosevelt Road at the junction of Kirk Road and continues through the western suburbs to its terminus at the junction of Mannheim Road. Roosevelt Road continues on an additional 14 miles without a route designation until terminating at US 41 (Lake Shore Drive).

Illinois Route 38 travels along the former route of US 330, that existed from 1926 to 1942. It spanned from Galt to Lynwood.

Route description 

Illinois 38 runs along the historic Lincoln Highway for much of its length, and parallels Interstate 88 as well. Illinois 38 serves some cities that have no interchanges on Interstate 88. It enters the Chicago metropolitan area at Elburn, as this border is pushed west with the extension of the Metra rail system. Except in cities, Illinois 38 has two lanes west of Geneva.

Illinois 38 generally has two lanes west of the Fox River, except in cities, and four lanes east of the river. From Villa Park to Interstate 294, Illinois 38 expands to six lanes and becomes a limited-access freeway with exits to Illinois Route 56, Illinois Route 83, Interstate 290 and Interstate 294. The ramp to Interstate 290 has an automated gate system that closes during high-volume periods, such as rush hours.

History 
SBI Route 38 initially ran between Kampsville and Jerseyville. In 1937, IL 38's western terminus was truncated as IL 100 was extended south of Kampsville while its eastern terminus was extended to Mount Clare. By 1941, the original route of IL 38 was decommissioned and was replaced by IL 16, IL 112, and IL 138. It remained decommissioned until 1972 when Alt US 30 was partly replaced with Illinois Route 38 while the rest was removed.

In 1914, one mile of a road near Malta, Illinois was paved with concrete. This was the first "Seedling Mile" of the concrete road on the Lincoln Highway. Seedling Miles were constructed on several portions of the Lincoln Highway to encourage the paving of the highway from coast to coast.

The Lincoln Highway was routed along modern-day Route 38 between Geneva and Dixon. When numbered US Highways began to replace named cross-country roads (like US 30 for the Lincoln Highway), this stretch of highway was signed as Alternate US 30.  In 1972, as traffic patterns shifted, these alternates to US highways became unnecessary and fell out of favor.

U.S. Route 330 

U.S. Route 330 (US 330) was a U.S. Highway that traveled from Galt to Lynwood, and was in service from 1926 to 1942. It has since been replaced in its entirety by Illinois Route 38 west of Bellwood, and by other local roads east of Bellwood to Lynwood.

US 330 branched off at Geneva, where US 30 ran along present Illinois Route 38 and Illinois Route 31, and ran east to Chicago. After several extensions on the west end, it became part of U.S. Route 30 Alternate from 1942 to 1971 and then Illinois 38 west of Mannheim Road since 1971.

Major intersections

References

External links

Illinois Highway Ends: Illinois Route 38
 Endpoints of historic U.S. Highway 330

U.S. Route 30
038
Lincoln Highway
DeKalb, Illinois
Transportation in Lee County, Illinois
Transportation in Ogle County, Illinois
Transportation in DeKalb County, Illinois
Transportation in Kane County, Illinois
Transportation in DuPage County, Illinois
Transportation in Cook County, Illinois